Dromochorus is a genus of beetles in the family Cicindelidae, containing the following species:

 Dromochorus belfragei Salle, 1877
 Dromochorus chaparralensis Duran et al., 2019
 Dromochorus knisleyi Duran et al., 2019
 Dromochorus minimus Duran et al., 2019
 Dromochorus pilatei Guerin-Meneville, 1845
 Dromochorus pruininus Casey, 1897
 Dromochorus velutinigrens Johnson, 1992
 Dromochorus welderensis Duran et al., 2019

References

Cicindelidae